How the Great Have Fallen is the third album by UK sludge metal band Raging Speedhorn. It is the first album by the band to be specifically released in the United States. It was also praised for the specific quality of its hidden track.

Track listing
A Different Shade Of Shit
Oh How The Great Have Fallen
Dead Man Walking
Master Of Disaster
Snatching Defeat From The Jaws Of Victory
How Much Can A Man Take?
Fuck You! Pay Me!
Slay The Coward
The Infidel Is Dead
Don't Let The Bastards Grind You Down

Bonus tracks
God of Thunder (Kiss cover)
Hatred (The Kinks cover)

References

2005 albums
Raging Speedhorn albums